James Gifford (10 January 1864 – 18 April 1931) was an Argentine sportsman who played football and first-class cricket.

Career
Gifford was born at Buenos Aires in January 1864. He played club cricket for Buenos Aires Cricket Club and also played against touring sides. He spent time in England, where he played first-class cricket for the Marylebone Cricket Club in 1897 and 1898, making five appearances. Gifford scored 143 runs in these five matches, with a highest score of 37.

Gifford also played football for Flores Athletic Club and was the top goalscorer in the 1894 Argentine Primera División with 7 goals. Gifford died at Buenos Aires in April 1931.

References

External links

1864 births
1931 deaths
Cricketers from Buenos Aires
Argentine people of English descent
Argentine footballers
Argentine cricketers
Marylebone Cricket Club cricketers
Flores Athletic Club players
Argentine Primera División players
Association footballers not categorized by position